is a private university in Ōbu, Aichi, Japan.

Until the school renamed itself to Shigakkan in 2010, the school was known as Chukyo Women's University.  The school was founded in 1905.

Despite that the name contained the word "women," the school had accepted male students since 1998.

Notable alumni
Jungle Kyona
Kaori Icho
Saori Yoshida

References

External links
 Official website 

Educational institutions established in 1905
Private universities and colleges in Japan
Universities and colleges in Aichi Prefecture
1905 establishments in Japan
Ōbu, Aichi
Former women's universities and colleges in Japan